I Love You Dude is the second studio album by German electronic music duo Digitalism, released on 15 June 2011 by V2 Records. The song "Forrest Gump" was co-written by Julian Casablancas of the Strokes.

Track listing

Notes
 The Japanese edition switches tracks 1 and 4 and includes a bonus track, "Sleepwalker", as track 7.

Personnel
Credits adapted from the liner notes of I Love You Dude.

 Jens Moelle – production, mixing, design
 İsmail Tüfekçi – production, mixing, design
 Cäthe – vocals on "Just Gazin'"
 Cornelius Ulrich – live drum performances
 Mark Ralph – vocal co-production
 Mike Marsh – mastering
 M†S – design

Charts

Release history

References

2011 albums
Digitalism (band) albums
Downtown Records albums
V2 Records albums